"Bitchin' Camaro" is a song by American rock band the Dead Milkmen, released on their debut album Big Lizard in My Backyard (1985). The song was written by vocalist Rodney Linderman, guitarist and vocalist Joseph Genaro, bassist Dave Schulthise, and drummer Dean Sabatino. The track contains an extended, nonsensical intro of two characters having a conversation, after which the song shifts into a hardcore punk song about the Chevrolet Camaro.

Though not a single, the song was the band's first to achieve popularity and airplay on college radio stations in the U.S. It is considered one of the band's best-known songs, alongside their later 1988 hit "Punk Rock Girl".

Background

The song features a rambling, extended introduction over a bluesy bassline of two characters speaking to one another. It parodies partying, rich kids, and surfer culture. Linderman got the idea for the tune after overhearing a conversation. He and Genaro told the band at rehearsal they would be improvising an intro to the song, and Schulthise began playing the bassline. After that, the song was completed. Linderman portrays the "talking-too-fast jokester" while Genaro acts as a "clueless airhead". The two individuals discuss going to the shore and Doors cover bands before arriving at the point of the song: the titular vehicle. From there, the song shifts into a hardcore punk song. The song's hardcore segment was inspired by the Suicidal Tendencies song "Institutionalized". Daniel Brockman, in a review for the website Vanyaland, says that in its quiet-loud dynamic, the track is not far removed musically from the band's forebearers, comparing its style to the Dead Kennedys and Circle Jerks.

WXPN in Philadelphia was an "early champion" of the tune, according to Sabatino; they played the homemade demo frequently which led to audience attendees knowing the song in full before its proper album release. Though not a single, the song achieved airplay on college radio stations across the U.S. The song was later featured in the Orange Is the New Black episode "Appropriately Sized Pots".

Reception
A 1985 review by Spin underground columnist Andrea 'Enthal calls it "an '80s answer to the Beach Boys car-and-surf songs, [which] blisters with high-speed drum bash and the ranted [lyrics]."
Jason Heller of The A.V. Club considers the song a sendup of "white-trash culture", and describes the song as "a hyperactive, stream-of-consciousness splatter of snotty vocals, jangling guitars, and wiry irreverence that was as much a comedy skit as it was a punk parody." He considered it the quartet's "first enduring classic." AllMusic reviewer Ned Raggett says, "As left-field a fluke hit single as it gets, its mix of bad taste, rock star mockery, and stoner humor still works well." Daniel Brockman praises the song in a review for the website Vanyaland, dubbing it the "quintessential viral-before-there-was-such-a-thing underground of hit of its time." He places it in the context of its importance to teenagers of the decade:

Personnel
Adapted from Big Lizard in My Backyard liner notes.

The Dead Milkmen
Joe Genaro – guitar, vocals, songwriting
Rodney Linderman – vocals, songwriting
Dean Sabatino – drums, percussion, songwriting
Dave Schulthise – bass guitar, songwriting

Production
Bob Dickie – production
John Wicks – production

References

External links
 Lyrics of this song at Genius

1985 songs
American punk rock songs
Chevrolet Camaro
Comedy rock songs
Songs about cars